Snagging, also known as snag fishing, snatching, snatch fishing, jagging (Australia), or foul hooking, is a fishing technique for catching fish that uses sharp grappling hooks tethered to a fishing line to externally pierce (i.e. "snag") into the flesh of nearby fish, without needing the fish to swallow any hook with its mouth like in angling. This is achieved by suddenly and vigorously pulling the line (either by handlining or with a rod) when movement is felt, causing the snag hook to "claw" into any fish unfortunate enough to be grappled by the hook points. Weighted multi-hook rigs can be used to increase chances of success, and modern technologies such as underwater video camera can also be used to visually aid and time the snagging.

Some herbivorous/algaevorous fish species, such as paddlefish, are not attracted to normal angling baits or lures as they primarily filter-feed on plankton. While these fish can be caught using nets, spears or pole hooks, snagging is also used as a less strenuous and more versatile technique. However, for fish species that can be enticed easily by baits or lures, snagging techniques are often discouraged or prohibited as it causes more mutilating injuries to the fish (which diminishes the fish's chance of survival even after catch and release) and is viewed as violating the principle of fair chase, and has been associated with overfishing (especially with multi-hook snag rigs) and other social controversies concerning animal cruelty.

Technique
After first casting a hook into the water, a snagger will wait until a fish is sighted, at which time they will reel in the hook until it is positioned above the fish. Once the fish is in line with the hook, the snagger then yanks on the line to "snag" the fish before attempting to reel it in. When fishing in a clear river, most snaggers will be able to observe their target's shadow or wake in the water to determine where their hooks need to be and when. To keep view of the hook, some snaggers use a brightly colored ribbon or cloth near the hook.

Legality

United States
Snagging, like other methods of fishing, is controlled by the wildlife regulating agency of each state. A list of the legality for each state follows.

United Kingdom
In the United Kingdom, the use of a stroke-haul or snatch, which includes any device designed to foul-hook salmon, trout or other freshwater fish, is prohibited by Section 1 of the Salmon and Freshwater Fisheries Act 1975. However, this legislation rationalised a number of previous Acts of Parliament, and the use of such devices was originally banned in 1851, although at the time it only applied to the taking of salmon and trout, but was subsequently extended to include all freshwater fish. The logic behind this was that foul-hooking was not a method that was legitimate either for commercial or sporting purposes, but was used by poachers, and this was reiterated by the Bledisloe Report published in 1961.

See also
Flossing

References

Recreational fishing